Sheohar Lok Sabha constituency is one of the 40 Lok Sabha (parliamentary) constituencies in the Indian state of Bihar. This constituency has been represented by veterans like Thakur Jugal Kishore Sinha an eminent freedom fighter and is known as the father of Cooperative Movement in India and Ram Dulari Sinha, former Union Minister and Governor. Their son Dr. Madhurendra Kumar Singh has also contested from Congress in 1989 General Election.

Assembly segments
Presently, Sheohar Lok Sabha constituency comprises the following six Vidhan Sabha (legislative assembly) segments:

Members of Parliament

Election Results

See also
 List of Constituencies of the Lok Sabha

References

External links
Sheohar lok sabha  constituency election 2019 result details

Lok Sabha constituencies in Bihar
Politics of Sheohar district
Politics of East Champaran district
Politics of Sitamarhi district